Arnold Joseph Toynbee  (14 April 1889 – 22 October 1975) was an English historian, a philosopher of history, an author of numerous books and a research professor of international history at the London School of Economics and King's College London. From 1918 to 1950, Toynbee was considered a leading specialist on international affairs; from 1924 to 1954 he was the Director of Studies at Chatham House, in which position he also produced 34 volumes of the Survey of International Affairs, a "bible" for international specialists in Britain.

He is best known for his 12-volume A Study of History (1934–1961). With his prodigious output of papers, articles, speeches and presentations, and numerous books translated into many languages, Toynbee was a widely read and discussed scholar in the 1940s and 1950s.

Biography
Toynbee (born in London on 14 April 1889) was the son of Harry Valpy Toynbee (1861–1941), secretary of the Charity Organization Society, and his wife Sarah Edith Marshall (1859–1939); his sister Jocelyn Toynbee was an archaeologist and art historian. Toynbee was the grandson of Joseph Toynbee, nephew of the 19th-century economist Arnold Toynbee (1852–1883) and descendant of prominent British intellectuals for several generations. He won scholarships to Winchester College and Balliol College, Oxford (literae humaniores, 1907–1911), and studied briefly at the British School at Athens, an experience that influenced the genesis of his philosophy about the decline of civilisations.

In 1912 he became a tutor and fellow in ancient history at Balliol College, and in 1915 he began working for the intelligence department of the British Foreign Office. After serving as a delegate to the Paris Peace Conference in 1919 he served as professor of Byzantine and modern Greek studies at the University of London. It was here that Toynbee was appointed to the Koraes Chair of Modern Greek and Byzantine History, Language and Literature at King's College, although he would ultimately resign following a controversial academic dispute with the professoriate of the College. In 1921 and 1922 he was the Manchester Guardian correspondent during the Greco-Turkish War, an experience that resulted in the publication of The Western Question in Greece and Turkey. In 1925 he became research professor of international history at the London School of Economics and director of studies at the Royal Institute of International Affairs in London. He was elected a Fellow of the British Academy (FBA), the United Kingdoms national academy for the humanities and social sciences, in 1937.

His first marriage was to Rosalind Murray (1890–1967), daughter of Gilbert Murray, in 1913; they had three sons, of whom Philip Toynbee was the second. They divorced in 1946; Toynbee then married his research assistant, Veronica M. Boulter (1893-1980), in the same year. He died on 22 October 1975, age 86.

Views on the post-World War I peace settlement and geopolitical situation

In his 1915 book Nationality & the War, Toynbee argued in favor of creating a post-World War I peace settlement based on the principle of nationality. In Chapter IV of his 1916 book The New Europe: Essays in Reconstruction, Toynbee criticized the concept of natural borders. Specifically, Toynbee criticized this concept as providing a justification for launching additional wars so that countries can attain their natural borders. Toynbee also pointed out how once a country attained one set of natural borders, it could subsequently aim to attain another, further set of natural borders; for instance, the German Empire set its western natural border at the Vosges Mountains in 1871 but during World War I, some Germans began to advocate for even more western natural borders—specifically ones that extend all of the way up to Calais and the English Channel—conveniently justifying the permanent German retention of those Belgian and French territories that Germany had just conquered during World War I. As an alternative to the idea of natural borders, Toynbee proposes making free trade, partnership, and cooperation between various countries with interconnected economies considerably easier so that there would be less need for countries to expand even further—whether to their natural borders or otherwise. In addition, Toynbee advocated making national borders based more on the principle of national self-determination—as in, based on which country the people in a particular area or territory actually wanted to live in. (This principle was in fact indeed sometimes (albeit inconsistently) followed in the post-World War I peace settlement with the various plebiscites that were conducted in the twenty years after the end of World War I—specifically in Schleswig, Upper Silesia, Masuria, Sopron, Carinthia, and the Saar—in order to determine the future sovereignty and fate of these territories.)

In Nationality & the War, Toynbee offered various elaborate proposals and predictions for the future of various countries—both European and non-European. In regards to the Alsace-Lorraine dispute between France and Germany, for instance, Toynbee proposed a series of plebiscites to determine its future fate—with Alsace voting as a single unit in this plebiscite due to its interconnected nature. Toynbee likewise proposed a plebiscite in Schleswig-Holstein to determine its future fate, with him arguing that the linguistic line might make the best new German–Danish border there (indeed, ultimately a plebiscite was held in Schleswig in 1920). In regards to Poland, Toynbee advocated for the creation of an autonomous Poland under Russian rule (specifically a Poland in a federal relationship with Russia and that has a degree of home rule and autonomy that is at least comparable to that of the Austrian Poles) that would have put the Russian, German, and Austrian Poles under one sovereignty and government. Toynbee argued that Polish unity would be impossible in the event of an Austro-German victory in World War I since a victorious Germany would be unwilling to transfer its own Polish territories (which it views as strategically important and still hopes to Germanize) to an autonomous or newly independent Poland. Toynbee also proposed giving most of Upper Silesia, Posen Province, and western Galicia to this autonomous Poland and suggested holding a plebiscite in Masuria (as indeed ultimately occurred in 1920 with the Masurian plebiscite) while allowing Germany to keep all of West Prussia, including the Polish parts that later became known as the Polish Corridor (while, of course, making Danzig a free city that the autonomous Poland would be allowed to use). In regards to Austria-Hungary, Toynbee proposed having Austria give up Galicia to Russia and an enlarged autonomous Russian Poland, give up Transylvania and Bukovina to Romania, give up Trentino (but not Trieste or South Tyrol) to Italy, and give up Bosnia, Croatia, and Slovenia so that newly independent states can be formed there. Toynbee also advocated allowing Austria to keep Czech lands due to the strategic location of its Sudeten Mountain ridges and allowing Hungary to keep Slovakia. Toynbee also advocated splitting Bessarabia between Russia and Romania, with Russia keeping the Budjak while Romania would acquire the rest of Bessarabia. Toynbee argued that a Romanian acquisition of the Budjak would be pointless due to its non-Romanian population and due to it providing little value for Romania; however, Toynbee did endorse Romanian use of the Russian port of Odessa, which would see its trade traffic double in such a scenario.

In regards to Ukraine (aka Little Russia), Toynbee rejected both home rule and a federal solution for Ukraine. Toynbee's objection to the federal solution stemmed from his fear that a federated Russia would be too divided to have a unifying center of gravity and would thus be at risk of fragmentation and breaking up just like the United States of America previously did for a time during its own civil war. In place of autonomy, Toynbee proposed making the Ukrainian language co-official in the Great Russian parts of the Russian Empire so that Ukrainians (or Little Russians) could become members of the Russian body politic as Great Russians' peers rather than as Great Russians' inferiors. Toynbee also argued that if the Ukrainian language will not be able to become competitive with Russian even if the Ukrainian language will be given official status in Russia, then this would prove once and for all the superior vitality of the Russian language (which, according to Toynbee, was used to write great literature while the Ukrainian language was only used to write peasant ballads).

In regards to future Russian expansion, Toynbee endorsed the idea of Russia conquering Outer Mongolia and the Tarim Basin, arguing the Russia could improve and revitalize these territories just like the United States of America did for the Mexican Cession territories (specifically Nuevo Mexico and Alta California) when it conquered these territories from Mexico in the Mexican–American War back in 1847 (a conquest that Toynbee noted was widely criticized at the time, but which eventually became viewed as being a correct move on the part of the United States). Toynbee also endorsed the idea of having Russia annex both Pontus and the Armenian Vilayets of the Ottoman Empire while rejecting the idea of a Russo-British partition of Persia as being impractical due to it being incapable of satisfying either Britain's or Russia's interests in Persia—with Toynbee thus believing that a partition of Persia would merely inevitably result in war between Britain and Russia. Instead, Toynbee argues for (if necessary, with foreign assistance) the creation of a strong, independent, central government in Persia that would be capable of both protecting its own interests and protecting the interests of both British and Russia while also preventing both of these powers from having imperialist and predatory designs on Persia. In addition, in the event of renewed trouble and unrest in Afghanistan (which Toynbee viewed as only a matter of time), Toynbee advocated partitioning Afghanistan between Russia and British India roughly along the path of the Hindu Kush. A partition of Afghanistan along these lines would result in Afghan Turkestan being unified with the predominantly Turkic peoples of Russian Central Asia as well as with the Afghan Pashtuns being reunified with the Pakistani Pashtuns within British India. Toynbee viewed the Hindu Kush as being an ideal and impenetrable frontier between Russia and British India that would be impossible for either side to cross through and that would thus be great at providing security (and protection against aggression by the other side) for both sides.

Academic and cultural influence

Michael Lang says that for much of the twentieth century, 

In his best-known work, A Study of History, published 1934–1961, Toynbee

...examined the rise and fall of 26 civilisations in the course of human history, and he concluded that they rose by responding successfully to challenges under the leadership of creative minorities composed of elite leaders.

A Study of History was both a commercial and academic phenomenon. In the U.S. alone, more than seven thousand sets of the ten-volume edition had been sold by 1955. Most people, including scholars, relied on the very clear one-volume abridgement of the first six volumes by Somervell, which appeared in 1947; the abridgement sold over 300,000 copies in the U.S. The press printed innumerable discussions of Toynbee's work, not to mention there being countless lectures and seminars. Toynbee himself often participated. He appeared on the cover of Time magazine in 1947, with an article describing his work as "the most provocative work of historical theory written in England since Karl Marx's Capital", and was a regular commentator on BBC (examining the history of and reasons for the current hostility between east and west, and considering how non-westerners view the western world).

Canadian historians were especially receptive to Toynbee's work in the late 1940s. The Canadian economic historian Harold Adams Innis (1894–1952) was a notable example. Following Toynbee and others (Spengler, Kroeber, Sorokin, Cochrane), Innis examined the flourishing of civilisations in terms of administration of empires and media of communication.

Toynbee's overall theory was taken up by some scholars, for example, Ernst Robert Curtius, as a sort of paradigm in the post-war period. Curtius wrote as follows in the opening pages of European Literature and the Latin Middle Ages (1953 English translation), following close on Toynbee, as he sets the stage for his vast study of medieval Latin literature. Curtius wrote, "How do cultures, and the historical entities which are their media, arise, grow and decay? Only a comparative morphology with exact procedures can hope to answer these questions. It was Arnold J. Toynbee who undertook the task."

After 1960, Toynbee's ideas faded both in academia and the media, to the point of seldom being cited today. In general, historians pointed to his preference of myths, allegories, and religion over factual data. His critics argued that his conclusions are more those of a Christian moralist than of a historian. In his 2011 article for the Journal of History titled "Globalization and Global History in Toynbee," Michael Lang wrote:
To many world historians today, Arnold J. Toynbee is regarded like an embarrassing uncle at a house party. He gets a requisite introduction by virtue of his place on the family tree, but he is quickly passed over for other friends and relatives.

However, his work continued to be referenced by some classical historians, because "his training and surest touch is in the world of classical antiquity." His roots in classical literature are also manifested by similarities between his approach and that of classical historians such as Herodotus and Thucydides. Comparative history, by which his approach is often categorised, has been in the doldrums.

Political influence in foreign policy
 While the writing of the Study was under way, Toynbee produced numerous smaller works and served as director of foreign research of the Royal Institute of International Affairs (1939–43) and director of the research department of the Foreign Office (1943–46); he also retained his position at the London School of Economics until his retirement in 1956.

Toynbee worked for the Political Intelligence Department of the British Foreign Office during World War I and served as a delegate to the Paris Peace Conference in 1919. He was director of studies at Chatham House, Balliol College, Oxford University, 1924–43. Chatham House conducted research for the British Foreign Office and was an important intellectual resource during World War II when it was transferred to London. With his research assistant, Veronica M. Boulter, Toynbee was co-editor of the RIIA's annual Survey of International Affairs, which became the "bible" for international specialists in Britain.

Meeting with Adolf Hitler
While on a visit in Berlin in 1936 to address the Nazi Law Society, Toynbee was invited to a private interview with Adolf Hitler at Hitler's request. During the interview, which was held a day before Toynbee delivered his lecture, Hitler emphasized his limited expansionist aim of building a greater German nation, and his desire for British understanding and co-operation with Nazi Germany. Hitler also suggested Germany could be an ally to Britain in the Asia-Pacific region if Germany's Pacific colonial empire were restored to her. Toynbee believed that Hitler was sincere and endorsed Hitler's message in a confidential memorandum for the British prime minister and foreign secretary.

Toynbee presented his lecture in English, but copies of it were circulated in German by Nazi officials, and it was warmly received by his Berlin audience who appreciated its conciliatory tone. Tracy Philipps, a British 'diplomat' stationed in Berlin at the time, later informed Toynbee that it 'was an eager topic of discussion everywhere'. Back home, some of Toynbee's colleagues were dismayed by his attempts at managing Anglo-German relations.

Russia
Toynbee was troubled by the Russian Revolution since he saw Russia as a non-Western society and the revolution as a threat to Western society. However, in 1952, he argued that the Soviet Union had been a victim of Western aggression. He portrayed the Cold War as a religious competition that pitted a Marxist materialist heresy against the West's spiritual Christian heritage, which had already been foolishly rejected by a secularised West. A heated debate ensued, and an editorial in The Times promptly attacked Toynbee for treating communism as a "spiritual force".

Greece and the Middle East
Toynbee was a leading analyst of developments in the Middle East.  His support for Greece and hostility to the Turks during World War I had gained him an appointment to the Koraes Chair of Modern Greek and Byzantine History at King's College, University of London. However, after the war he changed to a pro-Turkish position, accusing Greece's military government in occupied Turkish territory of atrocities and massacres. This earned him the enmity of the wealthy Greeks who had endowed the chair, and in 1924 he was forced to resign the position.

His stance during World War I reflected less sympathy for the Arab cause and took a pro-Zionist outlook. Toynbee investigated Zionism in 1915 at the Information Department of the Foreign Office, and in 1917 he published a memorandum with his colleague Lewis Namier which supported exclusive Jewish political rights in Palestine. He expressed support for Jewish immigration to Palestine, which he believed had "begun to recover its ancient prosperity" as a result. In 1922, however, he was influenced by the Palestine Arab delegation which was visiting London, and began to adopt their views. His subsequent writings reveal his changing outlook on the subject, and by the late 1940s he had moved away from the Zionist cause and toward the Arab camp; Toynbee came to be known, by his own admission, as "the Western spokesman for the Arab cause."

The views Toynbee expressed in the 1950s continued to oppose the formation of a Jewish state, partly out of his concern that it would increase the risk of a nuclear confrontation. However, as a result of Toynbee's debate in January 1961 with Yaakov Herzog, the Israeli ambassador to Canada, Toynbee softened his view and called on Israel to fulfill its special "mission to make contributions to worldwide efforts to prevent the outbreak of nuclear war." In his article "Jewish Rights in Palestine", he challenged the views of the editor of the Jewish Quarterly Review, historian and talmudic scholar Solomon Zeitlin, who published his rebuke, "Jewish Rights in Eretz Israel (Palestine)" in the same issue. Toynbee maintained, among other contentions, that the Jewish people have neither historic nor legal claims to Palestine, stating that the Arab "population's human rights to their homes and property over-ride all other rights in cases where claims conflict." Toynbee did ultimately concede that Jews, "being the only surviving representatives of any of the pre-Arab inhabitants of Palestine, have a further claim to a national home in Palestine," but that such a claim is valid "only in so far as it can be implemented without injury to the rights and to the legitimate interests of the native Arab population of Palestine."

Negative views of Jews and Judaism: The "Toynbee heresy" and the Jew as "fossil" 
Toynbee's views on Middle East politics have often been linked with the negative evaluation of Jews and Judaism Toynbee expressed in his discussion of Jews and Jewish civilization more generally. In a famous speech entitled "the Toynbee heresy," Abba Eban, an academic of brilliant potential before he became a diplomat, analyzed the uniformly negative role and associations Toynbee assigned to Judaism and Jews in his history of civilization as a whole, and the degree to which this was in turn premised on a belief in the superiority of Christianity to Judaism. Eban noted how Toynbee used the term "Judaic" to describe what Toynbee considers to be instantiations of "extreme brutality," even, or especially, in instances where Jews themselves are in no way involved, such as the Gothic persecution of the Christians.  More generally, Eban observed throughout the first eight volumes of his civilization series, Toynbee has a habit of referring to the Jewish people as a "fossil remnant," a term Toynbee does not define but which emerges in his writing as expressing the idea that Judaism, a religion for Toynbee is defined by its "fanaticism," its "provincialism," and its "exclusivity," exists solely as a vehicle to deliver the superior civilization and moral code of Christianity. 

As Eban points out, Toynbee's reading of Jews and Judaism through a Christian lens colors his view of Zionism and the state of Israel. By characterizing Judaism as a morally primitive belief-system based on the idea that Jews are the "master race," and then asserting that Jews' claim to Israel is based on this premise, Toynbee figures Zionism as "kindred to Nazism." On the other hand, Toynbee argues that by failing to accept their fate as a Diaspora community and trying instead to replace the "traditional Jewish hope of an eventual Restoration of Israel to Palestine on God's initiative through the agency of a divinely inspired Messiah," Zionist Jews have the same "impious" relationship to their religion as Communists do to Christianity. Having thus equated Zionism with both Nazism and Communism, Toynbee asserts:

Dialogue with Daisaku Ikeda
In 1972, Toynbee met with Daisaku Ikeda, president of Soka Gakkai International (SGI), who condemned the "demonic nature" of the use of nuclear weapons under any circumstances. Toynbee had the view that the atomic bomb was an invention that had caused warfare to escalate from a political scale to catastrophic proportions and threatened the very existence of the human race. In his dialogue with Ikeda, Toynbee stated his worry that humankind would not be able to strengthen ethical behaviour and achieve self-mastery "in spite of the widespread awareness that the price of failing to respond to the moral challenge of the atomic age may be the self-liquidation of our species."

The two men first met on 5 May 1972 in London. In May 1973, Ikeda again flew to London to meet with Toynbee for 40 hours over a period of 10 days. Their dialogue and ongoing correspondence culminated in the publication of Choose Life, a record of their views on critical issues confronting humanity. The book has been published in 24 languages to date. Toynbee also wrote the foreword to the English edition of Ikeda's best-known book, The Human Revolution, which has sold more than 7 million copies worldwide.

Toynbee being "paid well" for the interviews with Ikeda raised criticism. In 1984 his granddaughter Polly Toynbee wrote a critical article for The Guardian on meeting Daisaku Ikeda; she begins writing: "On the long flight to Japan, I read for the first time my grandfather's posthumously, published book, Choose Life – A Dialogue, a discussion between himself and a Japanese Buddhist leader called Daisaku Ikeda. My grandfather [...] was 85 when the dialogue was recorded, a short time before his final incapacitating stroke. It is probably the book among his works most kindly left forgotten – being a long discursive ramble between the two men over topics from sex education to pollution and war."

An exhibition celebrating the 30th anniversary of Toynbee and Ikeda's first meeting was presented in SGI's centers around the world in 2005, showcasing contents of the dialogues between them, as well as Ikeda's discussions for peace with over 1,500 of the world's scholars, intellects, and activists. Original letters Toynbee and Ikeda exchanged were also displayed.

Challenge and response
With the civilisations as units identified, he presented the history of each in terms of challenge-and-response, sometimes referred to as theory about the law of challenge and response. Civilizations arose in response to some set of challenges of extreme difficulty, when "creative minorities" devised solutions that reoriented their entire society. Challenges and responses were physical, as when the Sumerians exploited the intractable swamps of southern Iraq by organising the Neolithic inhabitants into a society capable of carrying out large-scale irrigation projects; or social, as when the Catholic Church resolved the chaos of post-Roman Europe by enrolling the new Germanic kingdoms in a single religious community. When a civilisation responded to challenges, it grew. Civilizations disintegrate when their leaders stopped responding creatively, and the civilisations then sank owing to nationalism, militarism, and the tyranny of a despotic minority. According to an Editor's Note in an edition of Toynbee's A Study of History, Toynbee believed that societies always die from suicide or murder rather than from natural causes, and nearly always from suicide. He sees the growth and decline of civilisations as a spiritual process, writing that "Man achieves civilization, not as a result of superior biological endowment or geographical environment, but as a response to a challenge in a situation of special difficulty which rouses him to make a hitherto unprecedented effort."

Toynbee Prize Foundation

Named after Arnold J. Toynbee, the [Toynbee Prize] Foundation was chartered in 1987 'to contribute to the development of the social sciences, as defined from a broad historical view of human society and of human and social problems.' In addition to awarding the Toynbee Prize, the foundation sponsors scholarly engagement with global history through sponsorship of sessions at the annual meeting of the American Historical Association, of international conferences, of the journal New Global Studies and of the Global History Forum.

The Toynbee Prize is an honorary award, recognising social scientists for significant academic and public contributions to humanity. Currently, it is awarded every other year for work that makes a significant contribution to the study of global history. The recipients have been Raymond Aron, Lord Kenneth Clark, Sir Ralf Dahrendorf, Natalie Zemon Davis, Albert Hirschman, George Kennan, Bruce Mazlish, John McNeill, William McNeill, Jean-Paul Sartre, Arthur Schlesinger, Jr., Barbara Ward, Lady Jackson, Sir Brian Urquhart, Michael Adas, Christopher Bayly, and Jürgen Osterhammel.

Toynbee's works
The Armenian Atrocities: The Murder of a Nation, with a speech delivered by Lord Bryce in the House of Lords (Hodder & Stoughton 1915)
Nationality and the War (Dent 1915)
The New Europe: Some Essays in Reconstruction, with an Introduction by the Earl of Cromer (Dent 1915)
Contributor, Greece, in The Balkans: A History of Bulgaria, Serbia, Greece, Rumania, Turkey, various authors (Oxford, Clarendon Press 1915)
British View of the Ukrainian Question (Ukrainian Federation of U.S., New York, 1916)
Editor, The Treatment of Armenians in the Ottoman Empire, 1915–1916: Documents Presented to Viscount Grey of Fallodon by Viscount Bryce, with a Preface by Viscount Bryce (Hodder & Stoughton and His Majesty's Stationery Office, 1916)
The Destruction of Poland: A Study in German Efficiency (1916)
The Belgian Deportations, with a statement by Viscount Bryce (T. Fisher Unwin 1917)
The German Terror in Belgium: An Historical Record (Hodder & Stoughton 1917)
The German Terror in France: An Historical Record (Hodder & Stoughton 1917)
Turkey: A Past and a Future (Hodder & Stoughton 1917)
The Western Question in Greece and Turkey: A Study in the Contact of Civilizations (Constable 1922)
Introduction and translations, Greek Civilization and Character: The Self-Revelation of Ancient Greek Society (Dent 1924)
Introduction and translations, Greek Historical Thought from Homer to the Age of Heraclius, with two pieces newly translated by Gilbert Murray (Dent 1924)
Contributor, The Non-Arab Territories of the Ottoman Empire since the Armistice of 30 October 1918, in H. W. V. Temperley (editor), A History of the Peace Conference of Paris, Vol. VI (Oxford University Press under the auspices of the British Institute of International Affairs 1924)
The World after the Peace Conference, Being an Epilogue to the "History of the Peace Conference of Paris" and a Prologue to the "Survey of International Affairs, 1920–1923" (Oxford University Press under the auspices of the British Institute of International Affairs 1925). Published on its own, but Toynbee writes that it was "originally written as an introduction to the Survey of International Affairs in 1920–1923, and was intended for publication as part of the same volume".
With Kenneth P. Kirkwood, Turkey (Benn 1926, in Modern Nations series edited by H. A. L. Fisher)
The Conduct of British Empire Foreign Relations since the Peace Settlement (Oxford University Press under the auspices of the Royal Institute of International Affairs 1928)
A Journey to China, or Things Which Are Seen (Constable 1931)
Editor, British Commonwealth Relations, Proceedings of the First Unofficial Conference at Toronto, 11–21 September 1933, with a foreword by Robert L. Borden (Oxford University Press under the joint auspices of the Royal Institute of International Affairs and the Canadian Institute of International Affairs 1934)
A Study of History
Vol I: Introduction; The Geneses of Civilizations
Vol II: The Geneses of Civilizations
Vol III: The Growths of Civilizations
(Oxford University Press 1934)
Editor, with J. A. K. Thomson, Essays in Honour of Gilbert Murray (George Allen & Unwin 1936)
A Study of History
 Vol IV: The Breakdowns of Civilizations
 Vol V: The Disintegrations of Civilizations
Vol VI: The Disintegrations of Civilizations
(Oxford University Press 1939)
D. C. Somervell, A Study of History: Abridgement of Vols I-VI, with a preface by Toynbee (Oxford University Press 1946)
Civilization on Trial (Oxford University Press 1948)
The Prospects of Western Civilization (New York, Columbia University Press 1949). Lectures delivered at Columbia University on themes from a then-unpublished part of A Study of History. Published "by arrangement with Oxford University Press in an edition limited to 400 copies and not to be reissued".
Albert Vann Fowler (editor), War and Civilization, Selections from A Study of History, with a preface by Toynbee (New York, Oxford University Press 1950)
Introduction and translations, Twelve Men of Action in Greco-Roman History (Boston, Beacon Press 1952). Extracts from Thucydides, Xenophon, Plutarch and Polybius.
The World and the West (Oxford University Press 1953). Reith Lectures for 1952.
A Study of History
Vol VII: Universal States; Universal Churches
Vol VIII: Heroic Ages; Contacts between Civilizations in Space
Vol IX: Contacts between Civilizations in Time; Law and Freedom in History; The Prospects of the Western Civilization
Vol X: The Inspirations of Historians; A Note on Chronology
(Oxford University Press 1954)
An Historian's Approach to Religion (Oxford University Press 1956). Gifford Lectures, University of Edinburgh, 1952–1953.
D. C. Somervell, A Study of History: Abridgement of Vols VII-X, with a preface by Toynbee (Oxford University Press 1957)
Christianity among the Religions of the World (New York, Scribner 1957; London, Oxford University Press 1958). Hewett Lectures, delivered in 1956.
Democracy in the Atomic Age (Melbourne, Oxford University Press under the auspices of the Australian Institute of International Affairs 1957). Dyason Lectures, delivered in 1956.
East to West: A Journey round the World (Oxford University Press 1958)
Hellenism: The History of a Civilization (Oxford University Press 1959, in Home University Library)
With Edward D. Myers, A Study of History
Vol XI: Historical Atlas and Gazetteer
(Oxford University Press 1959)
D. C. Somervell, A Study of History: Abridgement of Vols I-X in one volume, with a new preface by Toynbee and new tables (Oxford University Press 1960)
A Study of History
Vol XII: Reconsiderations
(Oxford University Press 1961)
Between Oxus and Jumna (Oxford University Press 1961)
America and the World Revolution (Oxford University Press 1962). Public lectures delivered at the University of Pennsylvania, spring 1961.
The Economy of the Western Hemisphere (Oxford University Press 1962). Weatherhead Foundation Lectures delivered at the University of Puerto Rico, February 1962.
The Present-Day Experiment in Western Civilization (Oxford University Press 1962). Beatty Memorial Lectures delivered at McGill University, Montreal, 1961.
The three sets of lectures published separately in the UK in 1962 appeared in New York in the same year in one volume under the title America and the World Revolution and Other Lectures, Oxford University Press.
Universal States (New York, Oxford University Press 1963). Separate publication of part of Vol VII of A Study of History.
With Philip Toynbee, Comparing Notes: A Dialogue across a Generation (Weidenfeld & Nicolson 1963). "Conversations between Arnold Toynbee and his son, Philip … as they were recorded on tape."
Between Niger and Nile (Oxford University Press 1965)
Hannibal's Legacy: The Hannibalic War's Effects on Roman Life
Vol I: Rome and Her Neighbours before Hannibal's Entry
Vol II: Rome and Her Neighbours after Hannibal's Exit
(Oxford University Press 1965)
Change and Habit: The Challenge of Our Time (Oxford University Press 1966). Partly based on lectures given at University of Denver in the last quarter of 1964, and at New College of Florida and the University of the South, Sewanee, Tennessee in the first quarter of 1965.
Acquaintances (Oxford University Press 1967)
Between Maule and Amazon (Oxford University Press 1967)
Editor, Cities of Destiny (Thames & Hudson 1967)
Editor and principal contributor, Man's Concern with Death (Hodder & Stoughton 1968)
Editor, The Crucible of Christianity: Judaism, Hellenism and the Historical Background to the Christian Faith (Thames & Hudson 1969)
Experiences (Oxford University Press 1969)
Some Problems of Greek History (Oxford University Press 1969)
Cities on the Move (Oxford University Press 1970). Sponsored by the Institute of Urban Environment of the School of Architecture, Columbia University.
Surviving the Future (Oxford University Press 1971). Rewritten version of a dialogue between Toynbee and Professor Kei Wakaizumi of Kyoto Sangyo University: essays preceded by questions by Wakaizumi.
With Jane Caplan, A Study of History, new one-volume abridgement, with new material and revisions and, for the first time, illustrations (Oxford University Press and Thames & Hudson 1972)
Constantine Porphyrogenitus and His World (Oxford University Press	1973)
Editor, Half the World: The History and Culture of China and Japan (Thames & Hudson 1973)
Toynbee on Toynbee: A Conversation between Arnold J. Toynbee and G. R. Urban (New York, Oxford University Press 1974)
Mankind and Mother Earth: A Narrative History of the World (Oxford University Press 1976), posthumous
Richard L. Gage (editor), The Toynbee-Ikeda Dialogue: Man Himself Must Choose (Oxford University Press 1976), posthumous. The record of a conversation lasting several days.
E. W. F. Tomlin (editor), Arnold Toynbee: A Selection from His Works, with an introduction by Tomlin (Oxford University Press 1978), posthumous. Includes advance extracts from The Greeks and Their Heritages.
The Greeks and Their Heritages (Oxford University Press 1981), posthumous
Christian B. Peper (editor), An Historian's Conscience: The Correspondence of Arnold J. Toynbee and Columba Cary-Elwes, Monk of Ampleforth, with a foreword by Lawrence L. Toynbee (Oxford University Press by arrangement with Beacon Press, Boston 1987), posthumous
The Survey of International Affairs was published by Oxford University Press under the auspices of the Royal Institute of International Affairs between 1925 and 1977 and covered the years 1920–1963. Toynbee wrote, with assistants, the Pre-War Series (covering the years 1920–1938) and the War-Time Series (1938–1946), and contributed introductions to the first two volumes of the Post-War Series (1947–1948 and 1949–1950). His actual contributions varied in extent from year to year.
A complementary series, Documents on International Affairs, covering the years 1928–1963, was published by Oxford University Press between 1929 and 1973. Toynbee supervised the compilation of the first of the 1939–1946 volumes, and wrote a preface for both that and the 1947–1948 volume.

See also
 Toynbee tiles
 Fernand Braudel
 Christopher Dawson
 Will Durant
 Carroll Quigley
 Oswald Spengler
 Eric Voegelin
 World history

References

Footnotes

Bibliography
   online from ACLS E-Books

Further reading
  Beacock, Ian.  Humanist among machines – As the dreams of Silicon Valley fill our world, could the dowdy historian Arnold Toynbee help prevent a nightmare?  (March 2016), Aeon
 Ben-Israel, Hedva. "Debates With Toynbee: Herzog, Talmon, Friedman", Israel Studies, Spring 2006, Vol. 11 Issue 1, pp. 79–90
 Brewin, Christopher. "Arnold Toynbee, Chatham House, and Research in a Global Context", in David Long and Peter Wilson, eds. Thinkers of the Twenty Years' Crisis: Inter-War Idealism Reassessed (1995)  pp. 277–302.
 Costello, Paul. World Historians and Their Goals: Twentieth-Century Answers to Modernism (1993). Compares Toynbee with H. G. Wells, Oswald Spengler, Pitirim Sorokin, Christopher Dawson, Lewis Mumford, and William H. McNeill
 Friedman, Isaiah. "Arnold Toynbee: Pro-Arab or Pro-Zionist?" Israel Studies, Spring 1999, Vol. 4#1, pp. 73–95
 Hutton, Alexander. "'A belated return for Christ?': the reception of Arnold J. Toynbee's A Study of History in a British context, 1934–1961". European Review of History 21.3 (2014): 405–424.
 Lang, Michael. "Globalization and Global History in Toynbee", Journal of World History 22#4 Dec 2011 pp. 747–783 in project MUSE
 McIntire, C. T. and Marvin Perry, eds. Toynbee: Reappraisals (1989) 254pp
 McNeill, William H. Arnold J. Toynbee: a life (Oxford UP, 1989). The standard scholarly biography.
 Martel, Gordon. "The Origins of World History: Arnold Toynbee before the First World War", Australian Journal of Politics and History,  Sept 2004, Vol. 50 Issue 3, pp. 343–356
 Montagu, Ashley M. F., ed. Toynbee and History: Critical Essays and Reviews (1956) online edition
 Paquette, Gabriel B. "The Impact of the 1917 Russian Revolutions on Arnold J. Toynbee's Historical Thought, 1917–34", Revolutionary Russia, June 2000, Vol. 13#1, pp. 55–80
 Perry, Marvin. Arnold Toynbee and the Western Tradition (1996)
 Toynbee, Arnold J. A Study of History abridged edition by D. C. Somervell (2 vol. 1947); 617pp online edition of vol. 1, covering vols 1–6 of the original; A Study of History online edition

External links
 
 
 
 
 Toynbee bibliography
  large bibliography of secondary literature
 Site analysing passages in Toynbee's work
 Arnold Toynbee, The Challenge Hypothesis (1934)
 
 

1889 births
1975 deaths
20th-century English historians
Academics of King's College London
Academics of the London School of Economics
Alumni of Balliol College, Oxford
Council and directors of Chatham House
English Anglicans
Fellows of Balliol College, Oxford
Fellows of the British Academy
Members of the American Philosophical Society
Members of the Order of the Companions of Honour
People educated at Winchester College
Theoretical historians
Theorists on Western civilization
Toynbee family
World historians